Greek Braille is the braille alphabet of the Greek language. It is based on international braille conventions, generally corresponding to Latin transliteration. In Greek, it is known as Κώδικας Μπράιγ Kôdikas Brég "Braille Code".

There are actually two Greek braille alphabets, which differ in the assignment of a few letters:  Modern Greek Braille used in Greece, and International Greek Braille for Greek letters or words used in mathematics or otherwise embedded in English and other languages.

Modern Greek Braille 

Modern Greek Braille runs as follows:

Letters

Punctuation and formatting

The accent mark (acute accent) comes before the vowel or diphthong, but after the capitalization sign:   ά,  Ά,  αί. It is not used for diaeresis; ϊ is just .

Numbers
Digits are the same as in English Braille. Arithmetical symbols are:

International Greek Braille

International letter assignments differ somewhat from those above. In Modern Greek Braille, for example, the letter omega (ω) is written the same as Latin j, whereas in English or French braille texts it is written as a w, which it resembles in print.  Similarly, Modern Greek upsilon is written as Latin y, but in international Greek it is written as u, and the letter eta is inverted.  

This alphabet is used, for example, in mathematical notation in an otherwise Latin-braille text.  It also forms the basis for Greek letters in the Nemeth Braille and Gardner–Salinas braille codes. It is not used in Greece or Cyprus. In the table below, the letters which differ from Modern Greek Braille are highlighted. 

The Modern Greek digraphs are not used.  In addition, there are assignments for obsolete letters used in Greek numerals:

Polytonic
International Greek braille does, however, represent the polytonic vowels of ancient forms of the language, either as a separate accent mark with the normal vowel signs, or as a single braille cell for vowel+accent. Polytonic vowels sharing a braille pattern with obsolete letters are highlighted in the table.

See also

 Moon type is a simplification of the Latin alphabet for embossing. An adaptation for Greek-reading blind people has been proposed.

References 

French-ordered braille alphabets
Greek language